Pheromones is the debut studio album by Australian melodic punk/alternative rock band The Hard Aches, released on 22 May 2015 by Anchorhead Records.

Background and promotion
THe Hard Aches began working on their debut album in 2013. In an 2016 interview with The Brag, drummer Alex Upton explained: "A lot of the songs that ended up on Pheromones were written around the time that we put out our last EP (Organs & Airports) back in 2013. By the time that we’d recorded them, they were at least 18-months old and had been a part of the setlist for ages."

In April 2015, The Hard Aches released the single "I Get Like This", and announced the upcoming release of their debut album. The song, along with its accompanying music video, were well received by critics and fans. 

The Hard Aches released their debut album, Pheromones, in May 2015. The twelve-track album spawned a second single, "Knots", which also received a music video in July 2015.

Critical reception
The album received positive reviews. Happy Mag praised the album, saying "Pheromones is the ideal debut album, showing maturity and talent far beyond The Hard Aches’ experience as a relatively new band". Woroni gave the album a positive review, describing it as: "a great album for those thinking about jumping on the folk-punk bandwagon".

Track listing
Track listing adapted from BandCamp.

Personnel
The Hard Aches
 Ben David – lead vocals, guitar, bass guitar
 Alex Upton – drums

Additional musicians
 Brianna Mahoney – additional vocals
 Steve Rosewarne – additional vocals

Production
 Matt Hills – mixing and mastering

Design
 Chris Cowburn - cover design
 Bec Stevens - photography
 Sianne van Abkoude - insert design

Release history

References

2015 albums
The Hard Aches albums